Attica Market and Main Historic District is a national historic district located at Attica in Wyoming County, New York. The district encompasses 23 contributing buildings in the central business district of Attica.   The district developed between about 1827 and 1915, and includes buildings in a variety of architectural styles including Greek Revival, Italianate, Second Empire, and Romanesque Revival.  Notable buildings include the Farmer's Bank (1856), Walbridge Block (1853), Pfender Block (c. 1855), Young-Krauss Block (1907), Scott Building (1827), American Hall (1872), the Hardware Block (1853), and Masonic Temple (1908).

It was listed on the National Register of Historic Places in 2013.

References

Historic districts on the National Register of Historic Places in New York (state)
Greek Revival architecture in New York (state)
Italianate architecture in New York (state)
Second Empire architecture in New York (state)
Romanesque Revival architecture in New York (state)
Historic districts in Wyoming County, New York
National Register of Historic Places in Wyoming County, New York